United National Movement (ENM) is a liberal and pro-western political party in Georgia founded by Mikheil Saakashvili which rose to power following the Rose Revolution. Since the 2012 parliamentary election, it is the main opposition party.

History

United National Movement was founded in October 2001 by Mikheil Saakashvili, who has recently resigned from the government of Eduard Shevardnadze and left the ruling Union of Citizens party, accusing it of corruption and state capture. The party was intended to provide a focus for the Georgian reformist politicians supporting reforms to strengthen institutions of liberal democracy and further integration of Georgia into EU and NATO. Having achieved significant success in 2002 local election, the party looked forward to the 2003 parliamentary election as an opportunity to challenge the long-lasting rule of the increasingly unpopular ruling party.

Saakashvili and other Georgian opposition leaders formed a "United People's Alliance" in November 2003 to bring together the United National Movement, the United Democrats, the Union of National Solidarity and the movement "Kmara" in a loose alliance against the government of President Eduard Shevardnadze. The opposition parties strongly contested the outcome of the November 2, 2003 parliamentary elections, which local and international observers criticized for numerous irregularities. Following a crisis involving allegations of ballot fraud, Eduard Shevardnadze resigned as president on November 23, 2003, in the bloodless Rose Revolution. The United National Movement and its partners played a central role in the November 2003 political crisis. After the fall of Shevardnadze, the party joined forces with the United Democrats and the Union of National Solidarity to promote Saakashvili as the principal candidate in the presidential elections of January 4, 2004. Saakashvili won the election with overwhelming majority and was inaugurated on January 25. The United National Movement and the United Democrats amalgamated on February 5, 2004; the bloc National Movement - Democrats secured the constitutional majority in the fresh parliamentary elections (with ca. 75% of the votes).

The party aimed to re-assert sovereignty of the central government over the whole Georgian territory. This led to upsurge of tension with the authorities of Adjarian Autonomous Republic under Aslan Abashidze who had built an independent power base in Adjara in the course of Georgian Civil War and enjoyed broad autonomy under previous administration. Abashidze denounced the Rose Revolution as an unconstitutional coup. The crisis culminated in May 2004 when Abashidze stepped down as the mass demonstrations in Batumi called for his resignation.

The government promised to topple the corruption and fight the crime. It initiated a process of concentration of power in the hands of the executive, claiming that the broad executive powers were necessary to implement quick changes. The new government has achieved considerable progress in eradicating corruption. In 2008 Transparency International ranked Georgia 67th in its Corruption Perceptions Index, with a score of 3.9 points out of 10 possible. This represented the best result among the CIS countries and a dramatic improvement on Georgia's score since 2004, when the country was ranked 133rd with 2.0 points.

Georgia also strengthened fight against the thieves-in-laws. In December 2005 Georgian Criminal Code was reorganized to charge the criminal authorities with aggravating circumstances. The approach was focusing on harsher enforcement and penalties as ways to reduce crime and break criminal syndicates.

On October 29, 2004, the North Atlantic Council (NAC) of NATO approved the Individual Partnership Action Plan of Georgia (IPAP), making Georgia the first among NATO's partner countries to manage this task successfully.

Relations with Russia remained problematic. Since 1990s breakaway republics of Abkhazia and South Ossetia retained de facto independence from Georgia,  with Russia passively supporting separatist movements. Russian troops remained garrisoned at two military bases in Georgia and as peacekeepers in South Ossetia and Abkhazia. Saakashvili pledged to resolve the matter of territorial integrity and return separatist regions under Georgian control. Success in Adjara encouraged the new president to intensify his efforts towards bringing the South Ossetia and Abkhazia back under the Georgian jurisdiction. In August 2004, several clashes occurred in South Ossetia, which threatened military escalation.

In June 2004 the prominent Georgian tycoon in Russia Kakha Bendukidze was called by the president Mikheil Saakashvili to hold position of Minister of Economy. Kakha Bendukidze was known as an ardent supporter of the Laissez-faire economics, small government, deregulation of market and low taxes. Under his terms of ministerial office the thoroughgoing reformation along such lines was onset. The taxes were significantly lowered and privatisation was restarted. The government claimed that reforms brought the high growth of GDP to Georgia. Nevertheless, economic growth was not able to fully settle the problems of unemployment and one-fourth of the nation living under the poverty rate. Discontent over unemployment, low pensions and poverty, as well as claims of corruption in Saakashvili's inner circle, have greatly diminished President's popularity in the country. In Novement 2007, a series of mass protests were launched demanding the resignation of Saakashvili. The Georgian police used tear gas, batons, water cannons and high tech acoustic weapons in the streets of Tbilisi to disperse the protests. Saakashvili announced early presidential elections to be held in January 2008, effectively cutting his term in office by a year.

Saakashvili secured a victory in the presidential election with 53.7% of the votes despite the accusation of electoral fraud by the Georgian opposition. However, his support has significantly diminished and public trust lowered. In April 2008 Nino Burjanadze, chairperson of the Parliament and a long-standing political ally of Saakashvili, announced prior the upcoming parliamentary election, in a surprise move, that she is quitting the ruling coalition. In the election the UNM won 59.1% of the vote. Burjanadze soon declared the establishment of "a clear-cut opposition party" called Democratic Movement–United Georgia, criticizing Saakashvili for abuse of power.

August 2008 saw military escalation of frozen conflicts over South Ossetia and Abkhazia, with the involvement of Georgia as well as Russia. After a series of clashes between Georgians and South Ossetians, Russian military forces intervened on the side of the South Ossetian separatists and invaded Gori in Shida Kartli. The war ended with territorial losses for Georgia. Its aftermath, leading to the 2008–2010 Georgia–Russia crisis, were tense. The country managed to quickly recover after the 2008 economic crisis, but unemployment and poverty rates were still high. The pressure against Saakashvili intensified in 2009, when the opposition launched mass demonstrations against Saakashvili's rule. On 5 May 2009, Georgian police said large-scale disorders were planned in Georgia of which the failed army mutiny was part. According to the police, Saakashvili's assassination had also been plotted.

In December 2008, a former Prime Minister of Georgia Zurab Nogaideli announced that he is quitting United National Movement, setting up the Movement for a Fair Georgia party and unleashing heavy criticism of foreign and domestic policies of Mikheil Saakashvili.

On May 21, 2011 over 10,000 people protested against Mikheil Saakashvili's government in Tbilisi and Batumi. Nino Burjanadze and her husband Badri Bitsadze as well as other leaders of opposition were main figures. Protesters tried to prevent a parade commemorating Georgian Independence Day. Georgian police suppressed the demonstrations with tear gas and rubber bullets. Saakashvili accused the protesters of attempting to orchestrate the government takeover using paramilitary groups.

In October 2011 famous Georgian tycoon Bidzina Ivanishvili admitted his entrance to politics of Georgia. In December he established opposition political movement Georgian Dream and announced his desire to take part in the parliamentary election scheduled for October 2012. The Georgian Dream formed coalition with five other opposition parties with the intention to challenge the ruling United National Movement party. The Georgian Dream managed to mobilize the growing discontent over the government of United National Movement, especially among the people who felt left behind by policy changes initiated by the government after the Rose Revolution. The discontent climaxed two weeks before the elections after the Gldani prison scandal, which confirmed long-standing allegations of ill-treatment of prisoners, as video footage was released showing prisoners being tortured and beaten by the penal servants. The further investigation revealed that the head of Penitentiary Department of Ministry of Justice of Georgia Bachana Akhalaia was the one who had been managing the process of torturing the prisoners. The government's harsh policy against crime led to mass incarceration and overcrowding of Georgian penal system, which was kept under control by torture and sexual violence. The government was accused of giving police a free hand to fight crime to the point where they could mistreat the suspects. The new regime was described as "an extremely punitive and abusive criminal justice, law-and-order system, which ended up with the highest per capita prison population in Europe – even higher than in Russia – in which torture became absolutely routine... Almost zero acquittal cases in criminal trials, mass surveillance, telephone tapping, and a lot of pressure put on businessmen, including intimidation, so they contribute to government projects." Prior to the scandal, the government was praising the prison reform for breaking down the thief-in-law culture and the practice of managing criminal underworld from prison facilities. While the footage was labeled as having been made by "political motivated persons," the national prosecutor's office announced the arrests of 10 people, including the head of the Prison No.8 in Tbilisi, two deputies and prison guards, while several high-level officials resigned from their positions. The disclosure of videos triggered a wave of anti-government protests and increased the chances for the opposition to do well in the elections. The United National Movement fell to 40.3%, becoming the second largest party in parliament after Georgian Dream. Saakashvili admitted his party's defeat and promised not to obstruct peaceful transition of power. In 2013 presidential election the United National Movement suffered another defeat at the hands of Georgian Dream as the election was stated to be "efficiently administered" and "transparent." After elections, several former high-ranking officials were convicted on numerous charges, including Vano Merabishvili and Bachana Akhalaia. On 28 July 2014, criminal charges were filed by the Georgian prosecutor's office against Saakashvili over allegedly "exceeding official powers" during the 2007 Georgian demonstrations, as well as a police raid on and "seizure" of Imedi TV and other assets owned by the late tycoon Badri Patarkatsishvili. Saakashvili fled the country and accused the government of using the legal system as a tool of political retribution. He continued to manage the party from abroad.

After the defeat in the parliamentary election, the UNM suffered several defections of its parliament members to new parties. Including that of the libertarian New Political Center — Girchi by former UNM member of parliament Zurab Japaridze and three others. Shortly afterward, the party split on 12 January 2017, as a result of a conflict between Davit Bakradze, former Mayor of Tbilisi Gigi Ugulava, their supporters, and members of the party loyal to former President of Georgia Mikheil Saakashvili. Saakashvili had rejected the party's decision to enter parliament after the 2016 election, calling for boycott, and had furthermore opposed the initiative of party members to appoint a new chairman in his place. A majority of the UNM's electoral list defected to European Georgia, leaving the UNM with six members in parliament. Some believe these defections were encouraged by the ruling Georgian Dream Coalition in order to weaken its opposition.

Despite suffering continued failure to rehabilitate its reputation, the UNM remained the largest opposition party after the 2016 parliamentary election, in which it garnered 27.11% of the vote. The 2018 presidential election was seen as an opportunity for the party to restore its positions, since it was nearly successful in defeating the Georgian Dream-backed candidate Salome Zurabishvili, receiving 40.48% of the vote. However, the name of the United National Movement remained tainted by torture and rape during its political tenure. On 24 March 2019, Mikheil Saakashvili stepped down as the party's chairman. The attempt was launched to bring new faces in the party and give opportunities to the new leaders. Saakashvili remained the most influential figure in the party, being succeeded by his own nominee, Grigol Vashadze. On 15 December 2020, Grigol Vashadze resigned as the party chairman. The following election was won by Nika Melia, against Levan Varshalomidze.

Ahead of the 2020 parliamentary election, the United National Movement increasingly cooperated with other parties in opposition to the ruling Georgian Dream government and became member of opposition alliance including parties which have previously split from the UNM. The alliance was formed during the early 2020 in order to contest the Georgian Dream parliamentary majority in the upcoming election. However, it failed to garner a sufficient number of votes to defeat the Georgian Dream. The opposition boycotted the parliament, accusing the ruling party of the election fraud. The crisis culminated in April 2021 when the agreement was signed between the opposition and the Georgian Dream on electoral and judiciary reforms. However, the United National Movement refused to join the agreement citing disagreement over "some controversial clauses". Soon the Georgian Dream annulled its signatory status to the document, stating that the main reason for the withdrawal was that "the opposition [UNM] party which won the most opposition seats in parliament refused to join the agreement and other opposition parties were consistently violating the agreement, the ruling party was the only which was fulfilling the agreement". The tensions between the ruling Georgian Dream-Democratic Georgia party and the opposition United National Movement (UNM) culminated in the arrest of ex-president and ex-UNM leader, Mikheil Saakashvili. Former President Saakashvili claimed to have returned to Georgia prior to the 2021 local elections after an eight-year exile, and called on his followers to march on the capital, Tbilisi, if the government resorts to vote rigging. The Georgian police, however, claimed that Saakashvili was not in Georgia. He was arrested later on 1 October 2021. The MIA stated that Saakashvili had illegally crossed the border and was hiding in the flat in Tbilisi. He was transferred to the prison in Rustavi. On October 14, tens of thousands of Georgians have rallied in Tbilisi to demand the release of Mikheil Saakashvili. It was claimed that Saakashvili returned to Georgia to influence the results of the local elections. However, the United National Movement failed to defeat the Georgian Dream, finishing second with 30.67% of the vote.

In January 2023, Levan Khabeishvili was elected as Chairman of the United National Movement, defeating his predecessor Nika Melia.

Since the 2010s, the United National Movement's biggest rival has been the Georgian Dream party of billionaire Bidzina Ivanishvili, although the two parties share the same ideological orientations. In this context, political debates focus mainly on relations with Russia, with both parties accusing each other of 'playing into Moscow's hands'. Social issues are mostly absent from political speeches and debates.

Ideology 

Originally a center-left party, the UNM moved its position to center-right since the Rose Revolution and combines political, economic and cultural liberalism with cultural and civic nationalism. Its main political priorities include fighting corruption and crime, strengthening law and order, improving social services to the poor and reducing administrative barriers for doing business. It supports small government, deregulation of the economy, privatization, free market and policies of economic liberalism. The party advocates attracting foreign direct investments through business-friendly environment, low tax rates, abolition of capital control, and political stability with a goal of stimulating high economic growth in a short time frame. The UNM also supports increasing of government spendings in the social protection, education, military and infrastructure. Its economic model strongly resembles that of Four Asian Tigers. The government of the National Movement has been characterized as "perhaps the freest market government in the world" drawing influence from the theories of Friedrich Hayek and Milton Friedman, and policies of Margaret Thatcher in the UK and Ronald Reagan in the US.

The party has been varying on the topics of the social and cultural politics. Signing of the memorandum with the Tbilisi Pride on LGBT rights in May 2021 has cemented its status as a culturally liberal party. Nevertheless, the party itself tries to avoid clear association with either cultural liberalism or conservatism and tries to garner support from both sides. For example, in 2019 Mikheil Saakashvili has stated that he was always in support of traditional Georgian values and blamed Giga Bokeria for devaluing the image of the National Movement in the eyes of the conservative public. Giga Bokeria called this statement ridiculous, claiming that he was never in the position of power to make such decisions.

The National Movement supports a cultural form of nationalism, trying to reconcile it with culturally liberal values, resembling a national liberal party. Thus, it abandoned the traditionally ethnic-based form of Georgian nationalism, defining the nation in terms of culture and shared values instead of ethnicity and bloodline. The party's nationalist agenda encompasses ethnic minorities, including Abkhazians and Ossetians in respective breakaway republics, which are deemed as inseparable parts of Georgian nation like other minorities.

The UNM's foreign policy programme has a strong emphasis on Euro-Atlantic integration. During the first years in government, the party has tried to reconcile with Russia on topics of Abkhazia and South Ossetia, with Mikheil Saakashvili visiting Vladimir Putin in Moscow numerous times to hold negotiations. Although its stance changed drastically since the 2008 war, when Russia was identified as the number one threat of Georgian national security. The party deems Russian actions against Georgia as imperialistic attempts to preserve its sphere of influence in the South Caucasus, blocking Georgian integration into the EU and NATO.

The UNM has received public criticism for crackdown on peaceful protests in 2007 and 2011, police brutality, zero tolerance policy, torture of inmates in the prisons and cronyism. Some critics have characterized the UNM regime as a "liberal autocracy".

Electoral performance

Parliamentary elections

Presidential elections

Local elections

Further reading
Ghia Nodia, Álvaro Pinto Scholtbach: The Political Landscape of Georgia: Political Parties: Achievements, Challenges and Prospects. Eburon, Delft 2006, 
Lincoln A. Mitchell: Uncertain Democracy: U.S. Foreign Policy and Georgia's Rose Revolution. University of Pennsylvania Press 2008,

See also
:Category:United National Movement (Georgia) politicians
Rose Revolution
Politics of Georgia (country)

References

Notes

Citations

External links
Official website
Official website in English

2001 establishments in Georgia (country)
International Democrat Union member parties
Centre-right parties in Georgia (country)
Political parties established in 2001
Political parties in Georgia (country)
Pro-European political parties in Georgia (country)
Rose Revolution